A Moving Sound or Sheng Dong is a Taiwanese performance group co-directed by vocalist/dancer Mia Hsieh, vocalist, bass guitarist and zhong ruan player Scott Prairie. They are accompanied by host of wonderfully talented Taiwanese musicians.

In A Moving Sound's music traditional Taiwanese music forms are reinterpreted to create new original song compositions. Instruments such as the erhu (fiddle), the zhong ruan (lute), and the transcendent vocals and dance of lead singer Mia Hsieh, transport listeners on a journey that Global Rhythm magazine described as “...delicately balanced between many worlds...an entryway to Eastern music and artful expression of the human condition."

A Moving Sound has attracted international attention for opening doors to the under explored territory of Far Eastern music. The group is intensely passionate about how it presents the use of traditional instruments in its contemporary sound. Their approach is to be holistic – combining art, spirituality, social awareness, and a universal love of humanity play key roles in the creative process.

According to Tom Pryor, music supervisor for National Geographic, "A Moving Sound is one of the most original outfits working in the world music arena today, an inspired marriage of Taiwanese traditional sounds and Western pop experimentation that forges an important new musical dialogue."  The Public Theater called their work "an exciting new development in the progression of Chinese music, joyous, evocative and enchanting.

They have performed all around the world, including well known festival WOMAD(BBC Radio3 stage), Kennedy center etc.. Their music was featured on Lonely Planet's program, Six Degrees, and on BBC, NPR, PRI. After releasing three albums in Taiwan, the group made their US debut on Motéma Music with a self-titled release in 2011. Their three albums are now available through ARC Music https://www.arcmusic.co.uk/

Genesis
The group was formed in 2000, while Mia Hsieh was on a trip to New York City to study  with Meredith Monk, Lynn Book.  She met Scott Prairie, and began the group in Taiwan. Prairie was sent to Carnegie Mellon University to study horn, but changed his major to psychology.  He returned to music via bass guitar while visiting Europe.  The two began an ensemble fusing Taiwanese traditional music with other musical styles found in Taiwan and music from surrounding Asia synthesized through their own unique artistic and spiritual vision.

Tour

Western Arts Alliance Juried Showcase, Seattle WA 2017
Arts Midwest Spotlight Showcase, Columbus OH  2017
Oregon Shakespeare Festival  2016
Regis College, Boston 2016
North Michigan University, US 2015
Detroit Institute of Art, US 2015
Illinois University, Urbana-Champaign, US 2015
Williams College, MA, US 2015
Queens Museum, New York, US 2015
University of North Carolina, Asheville, US 
LEAF Festival, North Carolina, US 2015
REDCAT Roy and Edna Disney/Calarts Theater, Los Angeles 2015
Melbourne International Arts Festival, Australia  2015
Nelson Arts Festival  New Zealand  2015
Dunedin Arts Festival   New Zealand   2014
Tübingen University Germany  2014   
Pohoda Festival      Slovakia  2014  
Zagan City    Poland    2014  
Colours of Ostrava  Festival  Czech Republic   2014
Heidelberg University   Germany  2014
Masala Festival     Germany  2014
Les Aubes Musicales  Switzerland     2014
Madison WI World Music festival   2014
Chippewa Valley WI   Heyde Center   2014
University of Massachusetts    2014
Boise State University   Idaho 2014
Skagit College Mcintyre Hall   Mt Vernon WA   2014
Humanitas World Music festival Washington State University 2014
Lincoln City Culture Center  Oregon  2014  
Globalquerque World Music Festival,    New Mexico 2013
Northern Arizona State University,   Arizona  2013
Great Performances at Vanderbilt Univ. Series, Tennessee 2013
The Kennedy Center,    Washington DC 2013
George Washington University,   Washington DC 2013
Flushing Council on Culture and the Arts, New York  2013
Dartmouth College,  New Hampshire 2013
WOMAD BBC Radio3 stage, England 2012
Itinerari  Festival, Trento Italy  2012
Small World Festival, Toronto 2011
Towson University, Towson MD  2011
University of California, Berkeley 2011
CSU, Monterey Bay World Theater  2011
Water and Music Festival, Qing Hi China 2010
STADT Contemporary Arts Center, Munich 2010
Shanghai World Exposition 2010
RichMix Arts Center, London 2010
Satellit Café, Paris Showcase 2010 
World Village Festival, Helsinki, Finland 2010
Festival of Cultural Diversity, Costellon Spain 2010
Culture Del Mondo, Cuneo, Italy -2009
Fest Der Kulturen, Augsburg, Germany – 2009
Dunya Festival, Netherlands -2008 
Global Sound Healing Conference, Los Angeles - 2008
Grand Performances, Los Angeles – 2007
Harbourfront Centre, Toronto – 2007
The Rubin Museum, New York City – 2007
Ollin Kan Festival, Mexico City -2007
The Quebec City Festival, Canada -2007
Grassroots Festival, Ithaca NY – 2007
Chicago World Music Festival – 2007
WOMEX, Music Exposition Spain – 2006
MOFFOM Festival, Prague, CZ – 2006
The New York Public Theater – 2006

Discography
Little Universe (2004; repackaged 2009)
Songs Beyond Words (2007)
Starshine (2009)
A Moving Sound [compilation] (Motéma Music, 2011)

References

External links

 
English language site
https://store.arcmusic.co.uk/search/for/a+moving+sound/

Taiwanese musical groups
Musical groups established in 2000